Constructor, formerly known as Schaffhausen Institute of Technology (SIT), is a private non-profit institute in Switzerland founded in 2019 by entrepreneur Dr. Serg Bell.

History 

The institute focuses on computer and software sciences and is partners with Carnegie-Mellon University and the School of Computing of the National University of Singapore.  The development of the institute is supported by the Canton of Schaffhausen in northern Switzerland through a 3 million Swiss franc ($3.2 million) funding deal. The academic strategy is set by the 2010 Nobel Laureate in Physics Konstantin Novoselov. In 2021, Constructor University planned to open an additional campus abroad, with Italy among the top candidates. In 2021, Constructor became the main shareholder of the private international Jacobs University in Bremen, Germany. According to the Senate, the new majority owner intends to invest 50 million euros in Jacobs University, half of which in the next two years.

Notable staff 

Cosntructor is managed by academics and scientists.

 Konstantin Novoselov, Chairman of the Strategic Advisory Board
 Mark Kamlet
 Mikhail Lukin
 Artur Ekert
 Nicolas Gisin
 Andrea Ferrari
 Rino Rappuoli
 Serguei Netessine
 Bertrand Meyer, Chair of Software Engineering
 Mauro Pezzè, Chair of Software Testing and Analysis

References

External links 

 Official website

Schaffhausen
Technical universities and colleges in Switzerland